Melrose Park is a village in Cook County, Illinois, United States. It is a suburb of Chicago. As of the 2020 census it had a population of 24,796. Melrose Park had long been home to a large Italian-American population.

The suburb was the home of Kiddieland Amusement Park from 1929 until 2010 (it closed in September 2009 before it was demolished in 2010 and the sign of Kiddieland was relocated to the Melrose Park Public Library, a Costco warehouse store now stands in its place), the Shrine of Our Lady of Mt. Carmel, Stern Pinball, Inc., the Melrose Park Taste, and the now-defunct Maywood Park horse racing track.

There is a Metra railroad station in Melrose Park with daily service to Chicago. Melrose Park is home to Gottlieb Memorial Hospital.

History 
According to the Encyclopedia of Chicago, in 1882 residents of a then-unincorporated portion of Proviso Township voted to establish their own municipality—called simply "Melrose" until 11 years later, in 1893, when the "Park" was added and population in the area began to steadily increase. The first Italian-Americans arrived in 1888.

On March 28, 1920, the F4 Palm Sunday tornado cut a  path over  through the village and killed ten people. It destroyed the Sacred Heart Church and attached convent.

At the turn of the 20th century, the population surge plateaued and industry began to stagnate; it was only after World War I that the local economy was able to recover, the result of a number of manufacturing companies setting up shop in the village. New industry, coupled with Melrose Park's prime geographic location next to the Proviso freight yards, led to a steady increase in the number of area jobs. This continued after World War II, with still more companies moving to Melrose Park. Zenith Electronics, Alberto-Culver, Jewel, and International Harvester (now Navistar) are some examples. Many of these companies are still located in Melrose Park and the local industry remains stable, but Alberto-Culver no longer exists, Zenith continues to exist as a brand only today, and Navistar’s plant facility closed in 2021 and was eventually demolished.

During the late 1990s, in an effort to attract more commerce, the village underwent major cosmetic improvements, beginning with the redesigning of all village street signs. The wooded area on both sides of Silver Creek, between Broadway and 17th Avenue along North Avenue, was almost completely excavated, the grass replaced, and wood chips were added along the bases of the remaining trees. Many busy streets were repaved and the athletic field next to the village hall was completely redone. This has helped not only to attract new businesses, but also many first-time home buyers.

The athletic field next to the village hall is named after the late Ralph "Babe" Serpico, father of the current mayor, Ronald M. Serpico.

Economy
Navistar International had a factory and an engine group office in Melrose Park which closed in 2021. This building was formerly a Buick plant that made aircraft engines for WWII. Melrose Park Immediate Care is a medical and dental clinic located in downtown Melrose Park. Melrose Park is also home to WellNow Urgent Care and West Lake Urgent Care.
  
Lake Book Manufacturing, a book manufacturing company of 200 employees, is taken over in March 2021 by the Italian company Grafica Veneta.

Geography

Demographics
As of the 2020 census there were 24,796 people, 7,861 households, and 5,450 families residing in the village. The racial makeup of the village was 26.48% White, 6.24% African American, 1.90% Native American, 1.30% Asian, 0.03% Pacific Islander, 43.16% from other races, and 20.89% from two or more races. Hispanic or Latino of any race were 74.69% of the population.

There were 7,861 households, out of which 74.28% had children under the age of 18 living with them, 43.34% were married couples living together, 15.32% had a female householder with no husband present, and 30.67% were non-families. 25.48% of all households were made up of individuals, and 11.75% had someone living alone who was 65 years of age or older. The average household size was 3.91 and the average family size was 3.22.

The village's age distribution consisted of 26.6% under the age of 18, 9.5% from 18 to 24, 31% from 25 to 44, 22.7% from 45 to 64, and 10.1% who were 65 years of age or older. The median age was 33.6 years. For every 100 females, there were 106.5 males. For every 100 females age 18 and over, there were 105.5 males.

The median income for a household in the village was $53,596, and the median income for a family was $58,589. Males had a median income of $35,774 versus $27,872 for females. The per capita income for the village was $21,881. About 12.6% of families and 15.8% of the population were below the poverty line, including 21.4% of those under age 18 and 13.5% of those age 65 or over.

Education
Elementary school districts serving sections of Melrose Park:
 Maywood-Melrose Park-Broadview School District 89
 Jane Addams Elementary School
 Melrose Park Elementary School
 Stevenson Middle School
 Mannheim School District 83
 Mannheim Middle School
 Scott Elementary School
 Enger School (for disabled children; Franklin Park)
 Bellwood School District 88
 Grant Elementary School
 Thurgood Marshall Elementary School (Bellwood)
 Roosevelt Middle School (Bellwood)

High schools and colleges in Melrose Park:
Private schools:
 Walther Christian Academy
 Colleges
 Lincoln College of Technology

Proviso Township High Schools District 209 serves Melrose Park students with Proviso East High School in Maywood.

Other private schools in the area are Fenwick High School in Oak Park and St. Patrick High School in Chicago.

The area’s community college is Triton College in River Grove.

Notable people 

 Joseph Aiuppa, Chicago mob boss notable for Las Vegas casino skimming. 
 Dominic Armato, actor, journalist, and food critic 
 Clara Cannucciari, host of the web series Great Depression Cooking with Clara and author of the book Clara's Kitchen
 Anna Chlumsky, actress, graduated from Walther Christian Academy in Melrose Park
 Tim Costo, outfielder and first baseman for the Cincinnati Reds
 Michael Finley, former NBA all-star with the Dallas Mavericks, played for several NBA teams   
 Roy Gleason, outfielder with the Los Angeles Dodgers
 Dennis Grimaldi, actor, dancer, director, choreographer and TV producer, Tony Award and Pulitzer Prize-winning theatre producer
 Ken Grundt, professional pitcher for several league baseball organizations
 Vinnie Hinostroza, professional ice hockey player for the Buffalo Sabres
 Carol Lawrence, actress, singer and dancer
 Berger Loman (1886–1968), soldier in the United States Army and recipient of the Medal of Honor for actions during World War I. In the 1950s, he resided at 1050 Montana Street.
 Corey Maggette, small forward and shooting guard for several NBA teams
 Caroline Myss, spiritual author
 Glenn (Doc) Rivers, guard for the Atlanta Hawks and now coach of the Los Angeles Clippers
 Vasili Spanos, Minor League third baseman, played for the US Olympic baseball team (2004)
 Mike Woodard, second baseman for the San Francisco Giants and Chicago White Sox
 Anthony Zizzo, mobster

Sports
In 2012, Melrose Park became home to the Chicago Vipers who play in the Continental Indoor Football League. They played their home games at Sports Zone before being renamed to the Chicago Pythons and moving to Homer Glen. They wrapped up following their inaugural season.

References

External links

Village of Melrose Park official website
Melrose Park Police Department
Melrose Park history from Encyclopedia of Chicago
Melrose Park Public Library
Melrose Park Public Library Historical Collection

 
Chicago metropolitan area
Populated places established in 1882
Villages in Cook County, Illinois
Villages in Illinois
1882 establishments in Illinois